Saltash East was an electoral division of Cornwall in the United Kingdom which returned one member to sit on Cornwall Council between 2013 and 2021. It was abolished at the 2021 local elections, being succeeded by Saltash Tamar.

Councillors

Extent
Saltash East represented the east of the town of Saltash, including Saltash station, the Tamar Bridge, and part of the suburb of South Pill (which was shared with the Saltash North division). The division covered 204 hectares in total.

Election results

2017 election

2013 election

References

Electoral divisions of Cornwall Council